Harrison is a Roanoke, Virginia neighborhood located in central Roanoke, that initially developed in the 1920s as an early Roanoke suburb.  It borders the neighborhoods of Melrose-Rugby and Washington Park on the north, Gilmer on the south, Gainsboro on the east and Loudon-Melrose on the west. Its northern boundary is concurrent with U.S. Route 460 (Melrose/Orange Avenue), and as of the 2000 Census Harrison has a population of 1,019 residents with 393 households.

History
With many of the existing structures dating from between 1900 and 1920, Harrison is noted as being one of Roanoke's longest established African-American neighborhoods. Some of its more notable institutions include the Harrison School and the Burrell Hospital, which were both the first facilities constructed in Roanoke specifically to serve the African-American residents of the city. Today Harrison is noted for its numerous American Foursquare designed homes and for the Harrison Museum of African-American Culture located in the former Harrison School.

References

External links
 Harrison & Washington Park Neighborhood Plan
 Northwest Neighborhood Improvement Council

Neighborhoods in Roanoke, Virginia